Egypt–Sudan relations are the bilateral relations between the governments of Egypt and Sudan. Contact between Egypt and Sudan goes back to trade and conflict during ancient times. In 1820, Egypt conquered Sudan, and continued to occupy the country, later as a condominium under the British, until Sudan declared Independence in 1956. Sudan later joined the Arab League, which Egypt is a founding member. Relations between successive governments in Egypt and Sudan have warmed and cooled relations at various times. Relations today are cordial, but tensions remain.

History

Pre-Modern relations 
Contact between Egypt and Sudan goes back to ancient times, when ancient trades routes have roots to 4000 B.C. The ancient Kingdom of Kush in northern Sudan and ancient Egypt engaged in trade, warfare and cultural exchange. During the New Kingdom of Egypt, Egypt conquered further south into Kushite lands. Later, the Kushites would conquer Egypt, founding the Twenty-fifth Dynasty of Egypt. Afterwards, Egypt would fall to the Persians, Greeks, and later Romans. During this time, Christianity spread to Egypt and Sudan. Egypt was conquered by the Rashidun Caliphate in 652 AD, but the caliphate failed to spread into Sudan. A peace treaty was signed between Muslim Egypt and Christian Sudan called the Baqt, lasting centuries. After the Ottomans conquered Egypt, Sudan gradually converted to Islam.

Egyptian occupation

Egyptian conquest and Mahdist uprising 
While Egypt was a province of the Ottoman Empire, Egypt conquered Sudan, led by the Ottoman Governor Muhammad Ali Pasha, founding the city Khartoum. After the Egyptian-Ottoman Wars from 1831 to 1841, Egypt became an autonomous tributary state of the Ottoman Empire, governed by the Muhammad Ali Dynasty. During this time period, British involvement in Egyptian grew, forming an Anglo-French debt commission that assumed responsibility for managing Egypt's fiscal affairs, that eventually forced Isma'il Pasha to abdicate in favor of his more pro-British son, Tawfiq Pasha. The British administrator Charles Gordon was appointed Governor-General of Sudan. A Sudanese religious leader Muhammad Ahmad declared himself the Mahdi and revolted against Egyptian rule. Egypt, with the support of the British, failed to suppress the uprising, and attempted to evacuate Sudan. Though Gordon was to organize the evacuation of Sudan, he found himself in the siege of Khartoum by Mahdist forces, eventually leading to his death. The Mahdist State continued to exist until 1899, when it was defeated by an Anglo-Egyptian force, establishing Anglo-Egyptian rule until 1956. During this time, the British effectively conquered Egypt after suppressing an anti-British uprising in 1882.

Condominium Agreement of Anglo-Egyptian Sudan 
The Condominium Agreement of January 19, 1899 provided for a joint administration of the Sudan by the British and Egyptian governments. Yet it was clear from the outset that Egypt's part of this administration was to be purely nominal. The supreme civil and military command of the Sudan was vested in the governor-general, who was nominated by the British government. Thus his appointment by Khedivial decree had few practical implications. It is, therefore, no wonder that during the whole period of the Condominium, all the governor-generals were British, and owed allegiance to the British government.While Sudan was officially a condominium between the governments of Egypt and Britain, divided from Egypt along the 22nd parallel, in reality the British Governor General effectively ruled Sudan as a colony. After the Egyptian revolution of 1919 and declaration of Egyptian independence in 1922, Egyptian nationalists demanded Egyptian authority over Sudan, citing historical connections with 'Unity in the Nile Valley', but British government involvement remained, especially after the assassination of Governor-General Sir Lee Stack, after which Egypt was forced to retreat all forces from Sudan. Egyptian nationalism during this time believed that Sudan rightfully belonged to Sudan, though Sudanese revolutionaries such as the White Flag League supported an independent Sudan. While the Anglo-Egyptian treaty of 1936 allowed Egypt to host troops in Sudan, the Sudan remained a de facto British colony. Two imperial powers, Britain and Egypt, sought to control Sudan. This rivalry led to the rise of Sudanese elites who tended to split into anti-Egyptian and anti-British factions. The National Umma Party under Sayyid Abd al-Rahman al-Mahdi supported Sudanese Independence from Egypt, while the National Unionist Party (NUP) under Ismail al-Azhari favored union with Egypt.

1947 negotiations 
On January 25, 1947, the British government informed Egypt that it intended to prepare the Sudan for self-government, though Egypt opposed self-government for the Sudan. The Egyptian government sought the removal of British troops in Sudan, and because of the historical connection between Egypt and Sudan, Sudan should be granted self-government under a political union with Egypt. Anti-British resentment in Egypt continued to rise, and on 16 October 1951, the Egyptian government abrogated the agreements underpinning the condominium, and declared that Egypt and Sudan were legally united as the Kingdom of Egypt and Sudan, with King Farouk as the King of Egypt and the Sudan. However, King Farouk was overthrown during the 1952 Egyptian Revolution by the Free Officers Movement, a group of army officers led by Mohamed Naguib and Gamal Abdel Nasser, declaring the Egypt a republic in on June 18, 1953. While Naguib, who was half-Sudanese and spent many years of his childhood in Sudan, supported a union between Egypt and Sudan, a treaty was signed in 1953 allowing Sudanese independence after 3 years. In the 1953 Sudanese parliamentary election, Ismail al-Azhari's NUP received a majority of seats in parliament. Despite winning a majority in the elections, Azhari realized that popular opinion had shifted against an Egyptian-Sudan union. Azhari, who had been the major spokesman for the "unity of the Nile Valley", therefore reversed the NUP's stand and supported Sudanese independence. On December 19, 1955, the Sudanese parliament, under Azhari's leadership, unanimously adopted a declaration of independence that became effective on January 1, 1956, creating the Republic of the Sudan.

Post-Independence Relations 
Gamal Abdel Nasser was able to politically outmaneuver Naguib, becoming president of Egypt in 1956. Sudan under Azhari had cordial relations relations with Egypt, until disagreements in 1958 over the border and water resources. Nasser's Egypt later united with Syria, forming the United Arab Republic (U.A.R), while a coup overthrew Azhari's government in that same year. Relations with the UAR and the new government under Prime Minister Abdallah Khalil improved, with both governments signing an agreement over the Nile's water in 1959. In 1969, a conspiracy of Sudanese officers overthrew the Sudanese government, led by Colonel Jaafar Nimeiry. Nimeiry adopted a pro-Arab nationalist political position, including signing the Tripoli Charter with the UAR and Libya, declaring the coordination of policies. He also signed treaties with Egyptian president Anwar Sadat, standing by him after Sadat's peace treaty with Israel.

Modern Relations 
The Nile, Egypt's lifeline, flows through Sudan before reaching Egypt. An estimated 95 percent of all Egyptians depend on the Nile for fresh water. In 1959 the two countries agreed on a formula for sharing the water, whereby Sudan was authorized to use approximately one quarter of the flow and Egypt about three quarters. The division was predicated on a set annual flow, which varies enormously from year to year. There is usually a surplus above this amount. As a result, use of Nile water by other riparians had not, by 2011, resulted in a crisis with Egypt and Sudan. Nevertheless, none of the other eight riparian states was signature to, nor received any water allocation in, this 1959 bilateral agreement. Since 2000 Sudan had begun expressing an interest in changing the terms of the agreement so that it would be able to use a larger percentage of the flow. Seven of the eight other riparian states—Burundi, the Democratic Republic of the Congo, Ethiopia, Kenya, Rwanda, Tanzania, and Uganda—also pressed for a revised water allocation formula. In 1999 the nine countries formed the Nile Basin Initiative as a forum for discussion about cooperating in the development of the Nile Basin. Since then, no agreement had been reached by 2011, mainly because Egypt and Sudan refused any reduction in their share of water. Egypt was also concerned that the 2005 Comprehensive Peace Agreement between the government of Sudan and the Sudan People's Liberation Movement would result in another riparian state in South Sudan. Egypt had hoped for a united Sudan because South Sudan will be another state with which it might have to negotiate water rights. In 2010 there was a sharp division between seven of the riparian states, which reached their own agreement, and opposition to that agreement by Egypt and Sudan.

While Egypt and Sudan generally agreed on the Nile water question, they had failed to resolve a longstanding dispute over the location of their border near the Red Sea, an area called the Hala'ib Triangle. Egypt occupied the disputed territory, but the matter remained ripe for future conflict. Al-Bashir revived the controversy as recently as 2010 when he stated that Hala’ib was Sudanese and would stay Sudanese.

Sadat's successor, Hosni Mubarak visited Sudan in 1985 after a military coup overthrew Nimeiry that year. Nimeiry lived in exile in Egypt until 1999. Relations between the two countries since the 1989 Sudanese coup have had their ups and downs. The relationship reached its nadir in 1995, when elements of the Sudanese government were complicit in a plot by an Egyptian terrorist group, Gama'a Islamiyya, to assassinate Egypt's president, Hosni Mubarak, while he was en route from the Addis Ababa airport to an Organization of African Unity (now African Union) summit in Ethiopia's capital. Sudan called these "unjust and unsubstantiated claims" in a UN letter. By the end of 1999, Egyptian anger toward Sudan had subsided, and President al-Bashir visited Egypt, where the two leaders agreed to normalize diplomatic relations. Al-Bashir returned to Cairo in 2002, at which time they expanded cooperation on a variety of practical issues. Mubarak repaid the visit by going to Khartoum the following year. In 2004 al-Bashir again went to Cairo, where the two leaders signed the Four Freedoms Agreement dealing with freedom of ownership, movement, residence, and work between the two countries. There has been cooperation on counterterrorism and development projects drawing water from the Nile, and the two governments agreed to establish a free-trade zone along the Egypt–Sudan border, where they would exchange commodities free of duty. Sudan has particularly appreciated Egyptian verbal and moral support for its policy in Darfur. Egypt also sent troops to the United Nations–African Union Mission in Darfur. Egyptian investments in Sudan reached US$2.5 billion by 2008 while Sudanese investments in Egypt totaled almost US$200 million. By 2010 Egyptian–Sudanese relations were better than they had been in many years, although several long-term contentious issues, such as the future status of South Sudan, ownership of the Hala’ib Triangle, and use of Nile water, remained unresolved.

Egypt nevertheless began preparing for the possible independence of South Sudan. In an effort to keep track of developments there, Egypt had about 1,500 military personnel assigned to the United Nations Mission in Sudan and had begun supporting a number of development projects in the South. It had a consulate in Juba, and Mubarak traveled there in 2008. Salva Kiir visited Cairo in 2009, when Egypt made clear it would accept the results of the January 2011 referendum on secession. In 2010, Egypt also offered a US$300 million grant for Southern water and electricity projects along the Nile.

Egypt's policy on Sudan was that it was in favour of a united Sudan, and therefore Egypt was not directly involved in the Sudan Peace Process that gave the peoples of South Sudan the right to secede and form an independent state in 2011 after the long Sudanese Civil War.

References

 
Relations of colonizer and former colony